Jan W. Jaworowski (March 2, 1928 in Augustów, Poland – April 10, 2013 in Bloomington, Indiana) was a Polish and American mathematician, topologist.

Biography 

His father was Jan Leonard Jaworowski, and his mother—Helena (maiden name Heybowicz).

He graduated (got master's degree) from the mathematical department of the University of Warsaw. He got his Ph.D. from the Polish Academy of Sciences in 1955, in Algebraic topology, under Karol Borsuk. He generalized the Borsuk–Ulam theorem about antipodes.

He taught at University of Warsaw, University of Ljubljana, and for years at The Indiana University Bloomington. He published 64 papers and was a promoter of at least 11 doctoral theses.

He was a member of the Institute for Advanced Study during the 1960/61.

Jaworowski specialized in the transformation groups theory.

References

Polish mathematicians
20th-century American mathematicians
Topologists
1928 births
2013 deaths
People from Augustów